Vilém Lugr (28 June 1911 – 17 August 1994) was a Czech footballer and football manager.

He played for SK Olomouc ASO, SK Židenice, SK Prostějov and SK Slezská Ostrava.
He worked for Křídla vlasti Olomouc, Lech Poznań, Śląsk Wrocław, Górnik Zabrze, Jönköpings Södra IF. He then became coach for IFK Norrköping, where he won the Allsvenskan in 1963 and Nyköpings BIS.

References

1911 births
1981 deaths
Czech footballers
Czechoslovak footballers
FC Zbrojovka Brno players
FC Baník Ostrava players
Czech football managers
Czech expatriate football managers
Czechoslovak football managers
Czechoslovak expatriate football managers
FC Baník Ostrava managers
Lech Poznań managers
Górnik Zabrze managers
Jönköpings Södra IF managers
Śląsk Wrocław managers
People from Poděbrady
People from the Kingdom of Bohemia
Expatriate football managers in Poland
Czechoslovak expatriate sportspeople in Poland
Association football defenders
Křídla vlasti Olomouc managers
Czechoslovak expatriate sportspeople in Sweden
Sportspeople from the Central Bohemian Region